IDSL is a four letter acronym that can stand for:

 International Day of Sign Languages
 ISDN digital subscriber line